The 2021 Limassol wildfires were wildfires that broke out near the Cypriot village of Arakapas on 3 July 2021, in the middle of a week-long heat wave that saw temperatures surpass 40 °C (104 °F). The fires spread throughout the Limassol District before being put out two days later with assistance from Greece, Israel, Italy, and the United Kingdom. They were described as the worst fires in the country's history. Four Egyptian men died in the fires, and a 67-year-old farmer was later arrested in relation to the starting of the initial fire.

References

2021 in Cyprus
Fires in Cyprus
Limassol District
2021 wildfires
2021 fires in Europe
2021 disasters in Cyprus